Uganda sent a delegation to compete at the 1976 Summer Paralympics in Toronto, Ontario, Canada. The country entered only one athlete, who competed in athletics. He did not win a medal.

Uganda competed in the Paralympics, but not in the 1976 Summer Olympics, as it took part in the African boycott of that year's Summer Games.

It was to be Uganda's last appearance at the Summer Paralympics before 1996.

Athletics

O. Obadiya (full name not recorded) was Uganda's only representative, and competed in the men's javelin throw (C category). He finished 15th out of 23, with a throw of 32.18m.

References

External links
International Paralympic Committee official website

Nations at the 1976 Summer Paralympics
1976
Paralympics